{{safesubst:#invoke:RfD|||month = March
|day = 18
|year = 2023
|time = 15:37
|timestamp = 20230318153748

|content=
REDIRECT Some Like It Hot (musical)

}}